The Visit is a 1964 French, Italian, German and American international co-production film distributed by 20th Century Fox. It was directed by Bernhard Wicki and produced by Darryl F. Zanuck and Julien Derode. The film's stars Ingrid Bergman and Anthony Quinn also served as coproducers.

The screenplay was written by Ben Barzman and adapted by Maurice Valency based on Friedrich Dürrenmatt's 1956 play Der Besuch der alten Dame (literally, The Visit of the Old Lady). At the film's end, protagonist Serge Miller's life is spared, but in the original play, the character (named Alfred Ill) is killed.

Along with Bergman and Quinn, the cast includes Irina Demick, Paolo Stoppa, Hans Christian Blech,  Romolo Valli, Valentina Cortese, Claude Dauphin and Eduardo Ciannelli. Bergman and Quinn would later costar again in the 1970 romantic melodrama A Walk in the Spring Rain.

Plot
Karla Zachanassian, a fabulously wealthy woman, returns to a decaying village that she had been forced to desert years earlier in disgrace. She bore a child by Serge Miller, who denied paternity. The purpose of Karla's visit is to arrange a deal with the town's inhabitants: in exchange for a vast sum of money, she wants Miller killed.

At first reluctant, the townspeople eventually accept the arrangement and Miller is condemned to death. At the last moment, Karla stops the execution and tells the citizens that they will have to live with the guilt of their murderous choice for the rest of their lives, while Miller will have to live with the knowledge that his friends and neighbors were willing to kill him for money.

Cast
 Ingrid Bergman as Karla Zachannassian
 Anthony Quinn as Serge Miller
 Irina Demick as Anya
 Claude Dauphin as Bardick
 Paolo Stoppa as Doctor
 Romolo Valli as Town Painter
 Valentina Cortese as Mathilda Miller
 Eduardo Ciannelli as Innkeeper
 Jacques Dufilho as Fisch
 Leonard Steckel as Priest
 Ernst Schröder as Mayor
 Fausto Tozzi as Darvis
 Hans Christian Blech as Captain Dobrik
 Lelio Luttazzi as First Idler
 Marco Guglielmi as Chesco
 Renzo Palmer as Conductor
 Dante Maggio as Cadek
 Richard Münch as Teacher

Reception
According to Fox records, the film needed to earn $6,100,000 in film rentals to break even but earned only $2,635,000, losing money for the studio.

Awards
 Bernhard Wicki was nominated for the Golden Palm at the 1964 Cannes Film Festival.
 The film received a nomination for Best Costume Design-Black and White (René Hubert) at the Academy Awards.

See also
List of American films of 1964

References

External links
 
 
 
 
 

1964 films
1960s English-language films
1960s French-language films
1964 drama films
American drama films
French drama films
CinemaScope films
20th Century Fox films
American black-and-white films
Italian films based on plays
German films based on plays
French films based on plays
American films based on plays
Films based on works by Friedrich Dürrenmatt
Films directed by Bernhard Wicki
Films set in Europe
Films produced by Darryl F. Zanuck
Films scored by Richard Arnell
English-language French films
English-language German films
English-language Italian films
Italian black-and-white films
French black-and-white films
German black-and-white films
1960s American films
1960s French films